is a Japanese composer in the field of contemporary instrumental and electronic music.

Career 
Omura studied with Isao Matsushita, Kenjirō Urata and Jo Kondo at the Tokyo University of the Arts. She then took music composition with Prof. Nicolaus A. Huber and electronic music with Ludger Brümmer and Dirk Reith at the Folkwang University of the Arts in Essen, Germany. She further studied electronic music at IRCAM in Paris, and Intermedia Art (master's degree) with Kiyoshi Furukawa in Tokyo. Her music has been performed in Japan, Korea, USA, and Europe (Wittener Tage für neue Kammermusik, Musica Viva (Munich) in Germany, Festival AGORA, Festival Acanthe in France, Gaudeamus Music Week in the Netherlands, Emufest in Italy, Bludenzer Tage zeitgemäßer Musik in Austria and Music from Japan in New York) by such orchestras and ensembles as the New Japan Philharmonic, Ensemble Modern, musikFabrik, Ensemble recherche, Ensenble resonanz and Nieuw Ensemble. Between 2006 and 2010, she was a guest artist at ZKM Center for Art and Media Karlsruhe in Karlsruhe, Germany, and from 2010–2011 she was a composer=in-residence at Künstlerhof Schreyahn.

Recognition 
 1994: Irino Prize in Japan
 1998: Gaudeamus International Composers Award in the Netherlands
 1999: Prize by Biennale Neue Musik Hannover
 2000: Förderpreis des Landes Nordrhein-Westfalen für junge Künstlerinnen und Künstler
 2000: ACL Yoshiro IRINO Memorial Prize by Asian Music Festival
 2004: Takefu Composition Award in Japan
 2005: Composition Prize for young composer by Japan Society for Contemporary Music
 2012: Supporting prize by Giga-Hertz-Preis by ZKM (Zentrum für Kunst und Medientechnologie) and Experimentalstudio des SWR

Discography 
 Double Contour / Kumiko Omura Portrait CD by fontec "Japanese Composer" series (2009)
 Double Contour for cello and live electronics (2001)
 Germination II 6 Players (Fl.Ob.Cl.Vn.Pf.Vib.) (2003)
 Hommage à Pluton ensemble and live electronics (2006–07)
 Mutation of the Möbius recorder and viola d'amore (2005)
 La complication d'image AB for alto/baritone saxophone (2002/7)
 Reticulation for Orchestra (1993–94)
 Imaginary Bridge for shakuhachi, ensemble and electronic sound (1998–99)
 Double Contour for cello and live electronics (2001) / Computer music journal sound and video anthology, vol. 28, (2004)
 La complicatiln d'image for tenor saxophone and live electronic (2002) / Takashi Saito (Sax) Solo CD by ALM Record in Japan (2003)
 Synapse for strings ensemble (2001–02) / Wittener Tage für neue Kammermusik 2002 bem WDR

References

External links 
 
 "Profile" and "More detailed profle", ZKM Center for Art and Media Karlsruhe
 
 Wittener Tage für neue Kammermusik 2002 beim WDR (2CD), Discogs
 Giga-Hertz-Preis 2012 ZKM

1970 births
20th-century classical composers
20th-century Japanese musicians
21st-century classical composers
Japanese classical composers
Japanese women classical composers
Living people
Musicians from Shizuoka Prefecture
21st-century Japanese composers
20th-century women composers
21st-century women composers
21st-century Japanese women musicians